Sam Holt or Samuel Holt may refer to:
 Samuel Holt (1880–1929), Irish politician
 Sam B. Holt (1902–1986), American football, basketball, and baseball coach and athletics administrator
 Samuel C. O. Holt (born 1936), public television and radio executive
 Lynching of Sam Hose (aka Sam Holt,  – 1899), African American lynched in Coweta County, Georgia